The Ministry General Secretariat of the Presidency is the cabinet-level administrative office (equivalent to the president's Chief of Staff) which serves in an advisory role to the President of Chile and her or his ministers in the governments' relations with the National Congress of Chile, the development of the legislative agenda, and keeping track of the bills and other legislative activity in Congress as they pertain to the government.

The ministry was created in 1990 during the government of Patricio Aylwin, and the first appointee and longest-serving Minister so far was Edgardo Boeninger Kausel.

The Minister Secretary-General of the Presidency is Ana Lya Uriarte, who was appointed by President Gabriel Boric on 6 September 2022.

Titulars

References

Sources

External links
Ministry General Secretariat of the Presidency website

General Secretariat of the Presidency